Nathan Brown (22 June 1807 – 1 January 1886) was an American Baptist missionary to India and Japan, Bible translator, and abolitionist. He is noted for his works on Assamese language, grammar and script.

In around 1843, based in Sibsagar, he began translating the New Testament into Assamese or Amar Trankôrta Yisu Khristôr Nôtun Niyôm which he published in 1848. In 1854, he published another book titled  meaning roughly Jesus Christ and his Holy Messages. He also translated prayers alongside his other missionary colleagues. His work Grammatical Notices of the Assamese Language was published by the American Baptist Mission Press in 1848. In 1846, with his colleague Oliver Cutter, he published Orunodoi, the first Assamese periodical. He also published works of contemporary and historical Assamese scholars, to name a few Ôxôm Burônzi (History of Assam) by Kashinath Phukan in 1844, Kitabôt Mônzôri (Mathematics, in Assamese verse) in two parts, Lilawôti and Pôdgônit by Bakul Kayastha in 1845, and Sutiya Burônzi in 1850, as well as others. In Assam, Brown is considered to be a pioneer and champion of the native language and literature.

Early life and missions to Burma and Assam

Born in New Ipswich, New Hampshire, he attended Williams College, where he graduated first in his class. He and his wife, whom he married in 1830, went on to serve as missionaries in Burma. Brown's original intention had been to translate the Bible into Burmese, but he soon found himself pulled into a mission along with Oliver Cutter and Miles Bronson in the Indian region of Assam.

In 1848, Brown published an Assamese grammar, followed by an Assamese translation of the New Testament. He found that the Assamese Bible published by William Carey from the Serampore Mission Press (1832), in circulation at the time, consisted of Bengali and Sanskrit loan words, so it was idiomatically inadequate. Therefore, he undertook (together with Carey's old colleague Pandit Atmaram Sharma) the project of translating the New Testament into pure and simple Assamese. From 1836 to 1873, Company and British Raj policy subsumed Assamese under the heading of Bengali. The language regained recognition in part due to Assamese publications edited by Brown, including an Assamese-English dictionary and an Assamese grammar book, as well as his association with Hemchandra Barua, who was taught at Brown's school.

Abolitionism
In 1850 Brown returned to America to join his brother William in the growing abolitionist movement. In his satirical work Magnus Maharba and the Dragon, an account of the battle against slavery, Rev. Brown used the pen name Kristofer Kadmus. This shows that he truly identified with the character in Greek Mythology that his life so paralleled. Cadmus was best known as a traveller and vector of culture and ideas. His journey in search of his lost sister Europa led to importation of the idea of alphabet into Greece. In myth, Cadmus killed a dragon that prevented mortals from reaching a sacred spring. He planted the dragon's teeth on the spot; they sprouted into armies that fought nearly to death, with the survivors building the city of learning.

The "haystack missionaries", including Nathan Brown, associated the account of the introduction of the Greek alphabet with the New Testament creation, and the idea of creating local alphabets for every language was an important first step towards the goal of a Bible translation for every language. The printing presses and schools of these missions also became a vehicle for empowerment of local language and culture.

Following his return from Assam to New England in 1848, Nathan Brown joined the abolitionist movement, delivering anti-slavery sermons in Boston. This struggle eventually resulted in the American Civil War. Many proponents of the anti-slavery movement had to deal with the bloody results of their efforts in a personal struggle of conscience. Rev. Brown dealt with the question of violent means in Magnus Maharba.

Missionary to the Japanese
After the war, in 1868, Brown turned his attention to the newly accessible Japan, at first by interacting with the students that Japan was sending to the Bridgeport Academy and Princeton University for education in Western world culture and technology. This cultural exchange was a two way process. Rev. Brown published another satire showing America as seen through the eyes of one of these Japanese students, which was sharply critical of New England's materialism, in place of spirituality. One exchange student, for whom Nathan Brown wrote a letter of reference to the Bridgeport Academy, eventually became an admiral in the Imperial Japanese Navy.

Brown's first wife died in 1871, and in 1872, having married again, he returned to overseas missionary work, this time traveling to Japan to join Jonathan Goble, the first Baptist missionary to that country. The two collaborated to construct the first Japanese Baptist church (First Baptist Church of Yokohama) in 1873. Brown also worked with Japanese scholar T. Kawakatsu to produce a  Japanese-language Bible based on what were then the oldest known Greek manuscripts; he would go on to print thousands of Hiragana copies for distribution  print versions (with the goal of access to the Bible by less educated persons who might not understand Kanji). Brown died in Yokohama in 1886.

See also
 Assamese Language Movement

References

External links

 Brown, Nathan. Grammatical Notices of the Asamese Language. (Sibsagor: American Baptist Mission Press, 1848).
 Brown, Nathan. The Histori Ov Magnus Maha'rba and the Blak Dragun. (New York, 1866).
 Brown, Nathan. Utato Fuçi: Hymns and Tunes in Japanese. (Yokohama: F.R. Wetmore & Co., 1876).
 Brown, Elizabeth W. The Whole World Kin: A Pioneer Experience Among Remote Tribes, and Other Labors of Nathan Brown. (Philadelphia: Hubbard Brothers, 1890).
"Nathan & Eliza Brown - Their contributions to Assamese Language"

1807 births
1886 deaths
19th-century American translators
19th-century Baptists
19th-century lexicographers
Activists from New Hampshire
American abolitionists
American expatriates in India
American expatriates in Japan
American lexicographers
American satirists
Baptist abolitionists
Baptist missionaries from the United States
Baptist missionaries in India
Baptist missionaries in Japan
Baptist missionaries in Myanmar
Creators of writing systems
Missionary linguists
People from New Ipswich, New Hampshire
Translators of the Bible into Assamese
Translators of the Bible into Japanese
Williams College alumni